Sait Faik Abasıyanık Museum is a historic house museum dedicated to the writer Sait Faik Abasıyanık in İstanbul, Turkey.

The museum is on Burgazada Island of Adalar district in Istanbul Province, one of the Princes' Islands  archipelago.

Sait Faik Abasıyanık (1906–1954)  was a famous short story writer in Turkey. After his death, his home was converted into a museum. During his lifetime he had donated the building to Darüşşafaka Association, a non-governmental institution to support the education of the poor fatherless. In 1959 five years after his death, Darüşşafaka took over the responsibility of the museum. The museum was opened on 22 August 1959. In 2009, the museum building underwent a restoration, and on 11 May 2013, it was reopened to visits.

The building consists of a basement, ground floor and two upper floors. The reading room and the slide show room are in the basement. The dining and the guest room are in the ground floor. The bed room and the reading room as well as two rooms reserved for his life story are in the first floor. The exhibitions about the Burgazada and the room of letters are in the second floor.

References

Museums in Istanbul
Museums established in 1959
1959 establishments in Turkey
Literary museums in Turkey
Historic house museums in Turkey
Adalar